Irving Reef, also known as Balagtas Reef (Mandarin), is a coral reef in the Spratly Islands, South China Sea. It is occupied by the Philippines as part of Kalayaan, Palawan, and is also claimed by the People's Republic of China, the Republic of China (Taiwan) and Vietnam.

There is a sand cay near the northern extremity.

References

Reefs of the Spratly Islands
Reefs of China
Reefs of the Philippines
Reefs of Taiwan
Reefs of Vietnam
Kalayaan, Palawan
Landforms of Khánh Hòa province